Powers Auditorium, in Youngstown, Ohio is one of the largest auditoriums in the Youngstown-Warren area. The facility is the main venue of downtown Youngstown's DeYor Performing Arts Center. The complex also includes the Adler Art Academy, Beecher Flad Pavilion, and Ford Family Recital Hall. Originally built in 1931 as the Warner Theatre, the former movie palace was renovated and reopened as Powers Auditorium in 1969.

The main tenant of Powers Auditorium is the Youngstown Symphony, which performs from October through May. The facility also hosts other musical acts, touring Broadway productions, and locally produced theater (primarily from Ballet Western Reserve and Easy Street Productions, two Youngstown-based theater companies).

History
Designed by the prominent theater architects Rapp and Rapp, Powers opened as the Warner Theatre on May 14, 1931, part of the massive chain of theaters operated by the Warner Brothers film company. The structure was built as a memorial to the late Sam Warner, who along with his brothers, resided in Youngstown before embarking on a career in film production. The Warner Theatre operated until 1968, when it was scheduled to be demolished to make way for a parking lot. A public outcry prompted the Edward W. Powers family to donate $250,000 to preserve the structure. The theater was preserved and renovated in 1969. Many items in the theater were auctioned off, and the auditorium underwent extensive acoustical renovation in order to make it a suitable concert hall. In September of that year, the building was re-christened as Powers Auditorium with a performance by the Youngstown Symphony.

Post-renovation
Powers Auditorium can hold a capacity crowd of 2,303. An impressive remnant of the golden age of cinema, the former movie theater is included on the National Register of Historic Places. In recent years, the structure's Art Deco facade was restored to its original appearance. Meanwhile, the building continues to be expanded.

In 2000, a new East Wing was completed, giving the Symphony a music library and administrative office, as well as an elevator and equipment that brought Powers up to standard in handicap accessibility. Recently completed is the Beecher Flad Pavilion, which comprises the Ford Recital Hall, a 600-seat auditorium for orchestra, brass, and choral performances; new kitchen facilities; new dressing rooms; expanded loading docks; and soundproofing so that Powers and the new auditorium can be used simultaneously.

See also
 List of concert halls

References

External links
 The Youngstown Symphony
 Listing for Powers Auditorium at Cinema Treasures

Buildings and structures in Youngstown, Ohio
Concert halls in Ohio
Music venues in Ohio
Theatres on the National Register of Historic Places in Ohio
National Register of Historic Places in Mahoning County, Ohio
Movie palaces
Theatres in Ohio
Theatres completed in 1931
Performing arts centers in Ohio
Tourist attractions in Youngstown, Ohio